The Ancient Dreams in a Modern Land Tour was a concert tour by Welsh singer-songwriter Marina. The tour supported her fifth studio album Ancient Dreams in a Modern Land (2021), and visited North America and Europe. The tour began on 2 February 2022 at SF Masonic Auditorium in San Francisco, California, and concluded on 25 May 2022 at the 3Olympia Theatre in Dublin. The tour was promoted by Live Nation Entertainment.

Set list
This setlist is representative of the show on 22 February 2022 in Philadelphia. It is not intended to represent all shows from the tour.

 "Ancient Dreams in a Modern Land"
 "Venus Fly Trap"
 "Froot"
 "Man's World"
 "Are You Satisfied?"
 "I Am Not a Robot"
 "Oh No!"
 "Purge the Poison"
 "Handmade Heaven"
 "Hollywood"
 "Happy"
 "Forget"
 "Can't Pin Me Down"
 "Teen Idle"
 "Highly Emotional People"
 "I Love You but I Love Me More"
 "How to Be a Heartbreaker"
 "Bubblegum Bitch"

Encore

  "Goodbye"

Shows

Notes

References

2022 concert tours
Marina Diamandis concert tours
Concert tours of the United Kingdom
Concert tours of the United States